Meridolum marshalli is a species of air-breathing land snail, a terrestrial pulmonate gastropod mollusc in the family Camaenidae. This species is endemic to Australia.

Distribution and ecology
This species of land snail is restricted to the Royal National Park in New South Wales. The snail's main habitat is wet areas near the Hacking River.
This snail eats soft green vegetation, rotting berries and humus.

References

marshalli
Gastropods described in 1951
Taxonomy articles created by Polbot